Dayton E. Phillips (1910 – 1980) was an American politician and a member of the United States House of Representatives for the 1st congressional district of Tennessee.

Biography
Born, Dayton Edward Phillips, on March 29, 1910 at Shell Creek, Tennessee in Carter County, he grew up on a farm, attended the country school, and went to Cloudland High School in Roan Mountain, Tennessee. From 1929 to 1931, he attended Milligan College in Tennessee. He attended the University of Tennessee at Knoxville and graduated with a Bachelor of Laws degree in 1934. He taught school in Carter County, Tennessee in 1931 and 1932.

Career
Phillips was admitted to the bar in 1935 and commenced practice in Elizabethton, Tennessee, and graduated from National University Law School in Washington, D.C. with a J.D. in 1936. He was the attorney for Carter County from 1938 to 1942. He was district attorney general of the first judicial circuit of Tennessee from 1942 to 1947. During World War II, he served as an enlisted man in the United States Army, with overseas service in the European Theater of Operations, from 1943 to 1945.

Elected as a Republican to the Eightieth and Eighty-first Congresses, Phillips served from January 3, 1947 to January 3, 1951,  but was not a successful candidate for renomination in 1950. He resumed the practice of law and was the chancellor of the First Chancery Court of Tennessee. He resided in Elizabethton, Tennessee.

Death
Phillips died on October 23, 1980 in Kingsport, Tennessee. He is interred at Happy Valley Memorial Park, Elizabethton, Tennessee.

References

External links
 

1910 births
1980 deaths
People from Carter County, Tennessee
Republican Party members of the United States House of Representatives from Tennessee
20th-century American politicians
People from Elizabethton, Tennessee
National University School of Law alumni
University of Tennessee alumni